Metastaseis and Pithoprakta is a ballet by New York City Ballet co-founder and ballet master George Balanchine to two orchestral works by Iannis Xenakis: Metastaseis, written 1953–54, and Pithoprakta, written 1955–56. The premiere took place 18 January 1968, at the New York State Theater, Lincoln Center with lighting designed by Ronald Bates.

Casts

Original  

Metastaseis 

   
and 22 women
 
and 6 men
 

Pithoprakta 
   
Suzanne Farrell 
and 7 women
 
Arthur Mitchell 
and 5 men

Revivals

Suzanne Farrell Ballet 
 
Pithoprakta

Washington DC 2007 

    
t.b.a.

New York City Center 2008 Fall for Dance festival 

    
t.b.a.

Articles  

Washington Post, November 16, 2007

Reviews  

  
NY Times by Don McDonagh, January 19, 1968
NY Times by Donal Henahan, January 19, 1968
NY Times by Clive Barnes, January 22, 1968 
 
NY Times by Alastair Macaulay, November 27, 2007
Washington Post, November 16, 2007 
Ballet, November, 2007

Ballets by George Balanchine
Ballets to the music of Iannis Xenakis
Ballets designed by Ronald Bates
1968 ballet premieres
Fall for Dance 2008 repertory